Saetta was a  torpedo cruiser built for the Italian Regia Marina (Royal Navy) in the 1880s. She was built in the mid-1880s, was launched in May 1887, and was completed in February 1888. Saetta spent the first decade of her career serving in the main Italian fleet, where she conducted peacetime training exercises. In 1897, she was withdrawn from front-line service and employed as a gunnery training ship, a role she filled for another decade. The Regia Marina ultimately sold Saetta for scrap in May 1908.

Design

She displaced  normally. Her propulsion system consisted of a pair of horizontal double-expansion steam engines each driving a single screw propeller, with steam supplied by four coal-fired locomotive boilers. She had a crew of between 57 and 70.

The primary armament for Saetta was three  torpedo tubes. For defense against torpedo boats, she was also equipped with two  /43 guns and four  /25 guns, all mounted singly. The ship carried no armor protection.

Service history

Saetta was built at the Regio Cantiere di Castellammare di Stabia (Royal Dockyard in Castellammare di Stabia). She was launched on 30 May 1887, and was completed on 16 February 1888. The maneuvers consisted of close-order drills and a simulated attack on and defense of La Spezia. Later that year, the ship was present during a naval review held for the German Kaiser Wilhelm II during a visit to Italy. In 1892, the Regia Marina used Saetta to conduct experiments with oil-fired boilers.

In 1893, Saetta was laid up in Naples for the year; at the time, the Italian fleet mobilized only a handful of vessels for the annual training maneuvers, preferring to keep the most modern vessels in reserve to reduce maintenance costs. The following year, Saetta was commissioned for two months to take part in the annual fleet maneuvers; she spent the rest of the year in reserve. Saetta was stationed in La Spezia in the 1st Maritime Department, along with her sister ship  in 1895, though the latter had been badly damaged in a collision and was decommissioned.

From 1897 to 1900, the ship served as a torpedo training ship. The following year, she was transferred to the gunnery school, where she train gunners for the fleet. In 1902, her gun armament was expanded to increase the types of weapons available for training. These included one  gun, four 57 mm guns, two  guns, one 37 mm gun, and one 37 mm revolving Hotchkiss gun. She was still serving in this capacity in 1904–1905, along with the old ironclad . Saetta was ultimately discarded on 14 May 1908 and subsequently broken up for scrap.

Notes

References

External links
 Incrociatori Marina Militare website

Folgore-class cruisers
Ships built in Castellammare di Stabia
1887 ships